Dot Hacker is the debut self-titled EP by alternative rock band Dot Hacker released in February 2012. The 4-track EP was followed by the release of their full-length debut album, Inhibition, later that year.

Track listing

References

2012 debut EPs
Dot Hacker albums